Hymenocallis baumlii  is a species of spider lily named in honor of botanist James Bauml. It is a bulb-forming perennial herb with showy white flowers. The species is known from the Mexican states of Chiapas, Tabasco, Quintana Roo, Yucatán and Campeche.

References

baumlii
Flora of Mexico
Plants described in 1979